Elections to elect all members (councillors) of Thanet District Council were held on 5 May 2011, as part of the 2011 United Kingdom local elections taking place simultaneously with the Alternative Vote Referendum. No political party won an overall majority of seats, meaning that the council went into 'No Overall Control' status for the first time since 1991. The Conservative Party ran a minority administration until December that year, when a Conservative councillor defected to the Independents group, enabling The Labour Party to run a minority administration until 2015. The District has as its main towns the beach resort towns of Ramsgate, Margate and Broadstairs.

Overall Results
After the election, the composition of the council is:

Results by ward
Listed below are the results in each of the 26 wards of Thanet District Council. Each ward elects 2 or 3 councilors, with the exception of Kingsgate ward, which only elects one member.

Beacon Road

Birchington North

Birchington South

Bradstowe

Central Harbour

Cliffsend and Pegwell

Cliftonville East

Cliftonville West

Dane Valley

Eastcliff

Garlinge

Kingsgate

Margate Central

Nethercourt

Newington

Northwood

Salmestone

Sir Moses Montefiore

St Peters

Thanet Villages

Viking

Westbrook

Westgate-on-Sea

References

2011 English local elections
2011
2010s in Kent